The Practice is an American legal drama created by David E. Kelley centring on the partners and associates at a Boston law firm. The series was broadcast for eight seasons from 1997 to 2004, initially as a mid-season replacement. The Practice won many Primetime Emmy Awards, including Outstanding Drama Series in 1998 and 1999. As part of the fictional universe in which many shows produced by David E. Kelley are set The Practice had crossover story arcs with Gideon's Crossing, Boston Public, and Ally McBeal in addition to its own more jovial spin-off series Boston Legal, which was broadcast from 2004 to 2008.

The Practice focused on the law firm of Robert Donnell and Associates (later becoming Donnell, Young, Dole & Frutt, and ultimately Young, Frutt, & Berluti). Plots typically featured the firm's involvement in various high-profile criminal and civil cases that often mirrored current events at the time of the episodes' initial broadcast. Conflict between legal ethics and personal morality was a recurring theme.

Series overview

Episodes

Season 1 (1997)

Season 2 (1997–98)

Season 3 (1998–99)

Season 4 (1999–2000)

Season 5 (2000–01)

Season 6 (2001–02)

Season 7 (2002–03)

Season 8 (2003–04)

See also
List of Ally McBeal episodes - includes crossover episode "The Inmates"
List of Boston Public episodes - includes crossover episode "Chapter Thirteen"
List of Gideon's Crossing episodes - includes crossover episode "Flashpoint"

References

External links

Practice, The
Episodes